was a Japanese football player. He played for Japan national team.

Club career
Marutani played for Osaka SC was founded by his alma mater high school graduates and many Japan national team players Yoshimatsu Oyama, Toshio Miyaji, Uichiro Hatta and Sakae Takahashi were playing in those days.

National team career
In May 1925, Marutani was selected Japan national team for 1925 Far Eastern Championship Games in Manila. At this competition, on May 20, he debuted against Republic of China. But Japan lost in this match (0-2).

National team statistics

References

External links
 
 Japan National Football Team Database

Year of birth missing
Year of death missing
Japanese footballers
Japan international footballers
Association football midfielders